Charles Clutterbuck (1806–1861) was a stained glass artist of Maryland Point, Stratford, London.

Personal Life
He was born in London on 3 September 1806, the son of Edmund and Susannah Clutterbuck, and baptised at Christ Church, Newgate Street, on 28 September 1806. Clutterbuck married Hannah Kinloch in St John's Church, Waterloo on 16 October 1828.

By March 1851, Clutterbuck was still a resident of Maryland Point, and described his occupation as an "Artist on painted glass, employing two men, five boys and one girl." Living with him were his wife, Hannah, and five children: Helen, Robert, Charles, Hannah, and Hugh.

He died at Maryland Point on 5 December 1861. His son, Charles Clutterbuck, carried on the business until 1882.

Examples of Work (incomplete)
Australia
 Garrison Church, Millers Point, New South Wales
 St Andrew's Cathedral, 
 Christ Church St Laurence, Sydney

England
 St. Mary's Church, Oakley, Buckinghamshire
 St. Peter and St. Paul's Church, Worminghall, Buckinghamshire
 Ely Cathedral, Ely, Cambridgeshire, Cambridgeshire
 St. Anne's Church Limehouse, London (E14)
 St. Andrew's Church, Buxton, Norfolk

References

External links
 Stained glass in Wales: Charles Clutterbuck (1806-1861) 

1806 births
1861 deaths
19th-century English painters
English male painters
English stained glass artists and manufacturers
19th-century English male artists